Ditto is a 2022 South Korean film written and directed by Seo Eun-young, starring Yeo Jin-goo, Cho Yi-hyun, Kim Hye-yoon, and Na In-woo. Remake of  the 2000 film of the same name, it depicts story of love and friendship that takes place when a man and woman living in different time periods, communicate through a ham radio by chance. It was released theatrically on November 16, 2022.

Synopsis 
Kim Yong is a college junior living in the year 1999, and Mo-nee living in the year 2022 is a sophomore of the same university. The two happen to get their hands on an old ham radio. During the total lunar eclipse in 1999 and 2022, the pair is magically able to communicate with one another across time through the radio and begin to talk about each other’s love and friendship.

Cast

From 1999
 Yeo Jin-goo as Kim Yong, a mechanical engineering student of class of 1995
 Kim Hye-yoon as Seo Han-sol, Yong's first love
 Bae In-hyuk as Kim Eun-seong, Yong's friend
 Nam Min-woo as Park Nam-hae, Yong's best friend
 Roh Jae-won as Joo Geun-tae, a mechanical graduate student and friend of Yong
 Shin Joo-hyeop as Park Man-soo, Yong's college classmate

From 2022
 Cho Yi-hyun as Kim Mu-nee, a sociology student of class of 2021
 Na In-woo as Oh Young-ji, Mu-nee's friend
 Lim Yu-bin as Lee Seon-ju, Mu-nee's best friend
 Kim Bo-yoon as Yeo-reum, Mu-nee's friend

Special appearance
 Park Ha-sun as a sociology professor at university

Production 
The first script reading of the cast was held on May 15, 2022 and filming began at end of May.  

The VIP premiere which was scheduled to be held on November 8 has been cancelled, due to aftermath of Itaewon disaster.

Original soundtrack

Part 1

Part 2

Part 3

Part 4

Part 5

Part 6

Part 7

References

External links
 
 
 
 

2020s South Korean films
2020s Korean-language films
South Korean romantic drama films
Films about time travel
Science fiction romance films
Films set in 2019
Films set in 2022
Films set in universities and colleges
Remakes of South Korean films